Elsie Mari Bates Freund (1912–2001) was an American studio art jeweler, watercolorist, and textile artist. She and her husband, Louis Freund, established an art school in Eureka Springs in 1941.

Elsie Bates was born on January 12, 1912, in Taney County, Missouri. She had two sisters. Her father, Ralph C. Bates, who was the superintendent of the game preserve, was of Irish and Cherokee descent. She attended a one-room schoolhouse in Taney County, where the game preserve owner’s daughter encouraged her interest by bringing her books and art supplies. In her teens, Bates boarded with a family in Girard, Kansas, so that she could attend high school. Her parents later moved to Branson, Missouri, and Bates graduated in 1929.

Bates then taught for one year, then she returned to the resort town of Branson and opened a gift shop, where she made trophies by molding live fish in plaster of Paris and using the mold to cast a plaster model of the fish, which she later painted, as well as jewelry that she made out of walnut shells.

In 1936, she met H. Louis Freund, a dashing mural painter touring the Ozark Mountains in a Model T Ford to observe and record a way of life that was fast disappearing. He courted Bates for three years while artist in residence at Hendrix College in Conway. In 1939, he saved $300 and bought Hatchet Hall, a large boarding house in Eureka Springs owned from 1909 to 1911 by the temperance advocate Carry Nation, saving it from being razed and sold for wood.

Bates married Freund in Hatchet Hall on July 6, 1939, and they moved into the old house and turned it into the summer Art School of the Ozarks, which they operated from 1940 to 1951. Her husband taught painting and drawing while she taught classes related to crafts, such as weaving and design. Eureka Springs continues to have a reputation as an artistic hub based on the Freunds' influence.

The Freund school operated only during summers, Elsie was able to study more, taking her first ceramics class at the Wichita Art Association in Kansas. This is where she began to develop a jewelry-making process that combined clay, glass, and later—at the suggestion of a Florida shop owner—silver. Louis named the works “Elsaramics,” but Elsie shortened this to “Elsa,” which she stamped on her jewelry.

In 1957, the national craft outlet America House in New York City accepted Freund’s jewelry, which was advertised in The New York Times and The New Yorker. After nearly seven years, Freund grew weary of filling repeat orders and discontinued the line in 1964. She and her husband went on a five-month Mediterranean tour, using the proceeds from her jewelry sales, and spent some of the time doing research and painting.

While Freund was turning her jewelry into a business, she was also experimenting with tie-dye techniques. Already proficient in watercolor, in 1953, she was accepted into the National Watercolor Society based on a peer review of her work and was the subject for a magazine article on her tie-dye technique. But her jewelry remains her most important work. She is remembered as one of the pioneer studio art jewelers in the United States. This group broke the usual mold by experimenting with modern design and alternative materials—she made jewelry out of clay, glass, and copper and aluminum wire, rejecting the machine and principles of mass production when it was normal to set precious stones in silver and gold. Her painting did not attract as much attention as her jewelry, which was recognized late in her life and is represented in more than a dozen museums in the United States, as well as a half dozen national and international museums in the United Kingdom and elsewhere in Europe. She was awarded the State of Arkansas Certificate of Recognition in 1991.

In 1995, Freund moved to Parkway Village, a retirement community in Little Rock. She died on June 14, 2001, and Richard Earl Grimes, chief of the Cherokee nation, conducted her memorial service. A second service was held in Eureka Springs, where she is buried.

References

Further reading 
 https://americanart.si.edu/artist/elsie-freund-5785
 http://uca.edu/artcollection/louis-and-elsie-freund/
 http://www.encyclopediaofarkansas.net/encyclopedia/entry-detail.aspx?entryID=458#
 http://www.heiferfoundation.org/supporters/remembrance/honorees/a-k/louis-elsie-bates-freund.html
 https://libraries.uark.edu/specialcollections/findingaids/ead/transform.asp?xml=mc1297

1912 births
2001 deaths
20th-century American artists
20th-century American jewellers
20th-century American women artists
American textile artists
American watercolorists
Artists from Arkansas
Artists from Missouri
People from Eureka Springs, Arkansas
People from Taney County, Missouri
Women jewellers